The 1933 U.S. National Championships (now known as the US Open) was a tennis tournament that took place on the outdoor grass courts at the West Side Tennis Club, Forest Hills in New York City, United States. The tournament ran from 2 September through 10 September for the men's tournament and  14 August through 19 August for the women's tournament. It was the 53rd staging of the U.S. National Championships and the fourth Grand Slam tennis event of the year.

Earlier in the year Jack Crawford had won the Australian Championships, French Championships and Wimbledon but his defeat in the final against Fred Perry meant he did not become the first tennis player to win the Grand Slam. This honor would go to Don Budge who won all four  Grand Slam tournaments in 1938.

Helen Wills Moody's retirement in the final to Helen Jacobs was her first loss at a Grand Slam tournament since Kitty McKane defeated her in the final of the 1924 Wimbledon Championships.

Finals

Men's singles

 Fred Perry defeated  Jack Crawford  6–3, 11–13, 4–6, 6–0, 6–1

Women's singles

 Helen Jacobs defeated  Helen Wills Moody  8–6, 3–6, 3–0, ret.

Men's doubles
 George Lott /  Lester Stoefen defeated  Frank Shields /  Frank Parker 11–13, 9–7, 9–7, 6–3

Women's doubles
 Betty Nuthall /  Freda James defeated  Helen Wills Moody /  Elizabeth Ryan default

Mixed doubles
 Elizabeth Ryan /  Ellsworth Vines defeated  Sarah Palfrey /  George Lott 11–9, 6–1

References

External links
Official US Open website

 
U.S. National Championships
U.S. National Championships (tennis) by year
U.S. National Championships
U.S. National Championships
U.S. National Championships
U.S. National Championships